Johann Adolf of Holstein-Gottorp (27 February 1575 – 31 March 1616) was a Duke of Holstein-Gottorp.

Life 
He was a third son of Duke Adolf of Holstein-Gottorp and his wife Christine of Hesse-Kassel (or Hesse-Cassel). He became the first Lutheran Administrator of the Prince-Bishopric of Lübeck (1586–1607) and the Administrator of the Prince-Archbishopric of Bremen (1589–1596). He became the Duke after the deaths of his two elder brothers. After succeeding in 1590 his father as ruling Duke the Bremian Chapter enforced his resignation in favour of his younger brother John Frederick of Holstein-Gottorp, Prince-Bishop.

Family and children
He was married on 30 August 1596 to Princess Augusta of Denmark, daughter of King Frederick II of Denmark. They had the following children:
 Frederick III of Holstein-Gottorp (22 December 1597 – 10 August 1659).
 Elisabeth Sofie (12 October 1599 – 25 November 1627), married on 5 March 1621 to Duke Augustus of Saxe-Lauenburg.
 Adolf (15 September 1600 – 19 September 1631).
 Dorothea Auguste (12 May 1602 – 13 March 1682), married in 1633 to Joachim Ernest, Duke of Schleswig-Holstein-Sonderburg-Plön.
 Hedwig (23 December 1603 – 22 March 1657), married on 15 July 1620 to Augustus, Count Palatine of Sulzbach.
 Anna (19 December 1605 – 20 March 1623).
 John (18 March 1606 – 21 February 1655).
 Christian, died young in 1609.

Ancestors

See also

 History of Schleswig-Holstein

|-

1575 births
1616 deaths
Dukes of Holstein-Gottorp
John Adolphus
John Adolphus
16th-century German bishops